Vikramsinh Ranjitsinh Patankar (born December 27, 1943) is an Indian politician from Maharashtra, who was a Member of Legislative Assembly (MLA), representing the Patan (Maharashtra Vidhan Sabha constituency) for five terms since 1983 to 2014,  winning 1983, 1985, 1990, 1995, 1999 and 2009 elections. He is a senior leader of the Nationalist Congress Party.

He served as the Minister of  Public works in the cabinet of Vilasrao Deshmukh from 1999 to 2004. In July 2004, he was given additional charge of Tourism Ministry in the Sushilkumar Shinde's cabinet.

Background and family 
Vikramsinh Patankar hails from Patan royal family, that participated in the establishment of Hindavi Swarajya. He received a bachelor's degree in commerce from the University of Baroda in 1962.

Career 
He was first elected as an MLA, by winning a bye-election in 1983  from Patan, and subsequently re-elected from the same constituency in 1985 assembly election on the ticket of Indian Congress (Socialist). In 1990, he won the seat, securing 62647 votes for Indian National Congress. He was re-elected in the 1995 assembly election by defeating nearest rival Shambhuraj Desai. In 1999, he successfully contested the election from the Sharad Pawar's newly formed party, Nationalist Congress Party.

In 1999, he was assigned the ministry of Public works in the chief minister Vilasrao Deshmukh's cabinet. In 2002, he was a Guardian Minister for Beed district of Maharashtra. He held additional charge of Maharashtra's Tourism Ministry in Sushilkumar Shinde's cabinet from July 2004 to November 2004.

He played a major role in the upcoming New Mahabaleshwar project in Satara district. During his tenure as PWD Minister, he worked on the completion of Mumbai Pune Expressway  and Bandra–Worli Sea Link. He helped set up one of the largest wind farm in Asia in Patan taluka of Maharashtra. Patankar also held the position of chairman of the Maharashtra State Road Development Corporation.

He lost the assembly election in 2004 by a small margin. In 2009, Vikramsinh Patankar won the assembly election from Patan constituency by defeating the Shiv Sena's candidate by a margin of 580 votes. Before being elected as an MLA, Vikramsinh Patankar was elected as a member of Zila Parishad (district council) from Satara district in 1972.

Positions held

References

External links 
 Official website- Archive

Living people
1943 births
People from Satara district
People from Maharashtra
Marathi politicians
Nationalist Congress Party politicians from Maharashtra
Maharashtra MLAs 1980–1985
Maharashtra MLAs 1985–1990
Maharashtra MLAs 1990–1995
Maharashtra MLAs 1995–1999
Maharashtra MLAs 1999–2004
Maharashtra MLAs 2009–2014